Bloodhouse is an Australian and New Zealand slang term for a pub, bar or hotel that has a reputation for violence and disorder. The term dates from early in the 20th century.

References

Australian slang
Australian English